Adavathur East  is a village in Srirangam taluk of Tiruchirappalli district in Tamil Nadu, India.

Demographics 

As per the 2001 census, Adavathur East had a population of 4,682 with 2,339 males and 2,343 females. The sex ratio was 1002 and the literacy rate, 79.12.

References 

 

Villages in Tiruchirappalli district